Olga Sharkova-Sidorova (born 5 May 1968) is a Russian fencer. She competed in the women's individual and team foil events at the 1996 and 2000 Summer Olympics. She also won a silver medal at the 1990 World Fencing Championships and the 1991 World Fencing Championships, and a bronze medal at the 1987 Summer Universiade.

References

External links
 

1968 births
Living people
Russian female foil fencers
Olympic fencers of Russia
Fencers at the 1996 Summer Olympics
Fencers at the 2000 Summer Olympics
Sportspeople from Samara, Russia
20th-century Russian women